Derna is a commune in northeastern Bihor County, Crișana, Romania, 50 km from the county seat, Oradea and 35 km from Marghita. It borders the communes of Popești, Chișlaz, Brusturi and Spinuș. It is composed of five villages: Derna, Dernișoara (Alsóderna), Sacalasău (Sástelek), Sacalasău Nou (Újsástelek) and Tria (Terje).

Demographics
At the 2011 census, 72.5% of inhabitants were Romanians, 19.4% Slovaks, 6.8% Hungarians and 1.1% Roma.

Natives
Miron Cozma (born 1954), former labor-union organizer and politician, and leader of the Jiu Valley coal miners' union

References

Communes in Bihor County
Localities in Crișana